James, Jim, or Jimmy Cole may refer to:

Politics
 James Cole (politician) (1808–1861), architect and politician in the colony of South Australia
 James Cole Mountflorence (died 1820), born James Cole, American businessman and diplomat
 James D. Cole (born 1937), American politician, Texas House of Representatives
 James Cole Jr., official in the United States Department of Education
 James Cole (Oregon politician), see list of members of the Oregon Territorial Legislature#1857
 James L. Cole (c. 1814–1883), Justice of the Louisiana Supreme Court

Sports
 Jim Cole (footballer) (1925–1997), Welsh footballer
 Jim Cole (ice hockey) (born 1951), Canadian former professional ice hockey player
 Jim Cole (American football) (born 1952), American football coach
 Jimmy Cole (American football) (1931/1932–2022), American football player and official
 James Cole (racing driver) (born 1988), British racing driver

Characters
 James Cole, a character in the film 12 Monkeys, and the subsequent TV series
 James Cole, a character in the TV series Lie to Me, played by Jake Thomas

Other
 James Kelly Cole (1885–1909), poet and Industrial Workers of the World member
 James M. Cole (born 1952), former U.S. Deputy Attorney General
 James W. "Catfish" Cole (1924–1967), Grand Dragon of the Ku Klux Klan of North Carolina and South Carolina
 James Cole, musician in Europeans and Brazil
 James Cole, namesake of Cole's Hill

See also
 Cole (name)
 James Chris Cole, skateboarder
 James Cole Elementary School